Park Sang-young ( or  ; born 16 October 1995) is a South Korean right-handed épée fencer, three-time team Asian champion, 2021 team Olympic bronze medalist, and 2016 individual Olympic champion.

Early life
Park was introduced to fencing in middle school. He nearly had to give up the sport as his family could not afford the expensive equipment but financial aid from a non-profit charity and his admission into Gyeongnam Physical Education High School, a public school, allowed him to continue to fencing. During his first year in high school, he won first place in the individual épée category at the national high school championships.

Career
Park was junior world champion in Moscow in 2012, becoming the first South Korean male junior fencer to win a medal in the épée event. He qualified for the senior national team in 2013 by winning the national championship, a rarity for a high school student as fencers generally competed at collegiate level before making the step up. Dubbed a "monster rookie", he made headlines by narrowly defeating veterans Kweon Young-jun and Jung Jin-sun.

Park joined the senior category in the 2013–14 season, during which he won the 2014 Doha Grand Prix and the 2014 Berne Grand Prix. As part of the South Korean team he won a gold medal at the 2014 Asian Fencing Championships in Suwon and at the 2014 Asian Games in Incheon, as well as a silver medal at the 2014 World Fencing Championships. He finished the season world no.3.

The 2014–15 season proved more difficult for Park. He sustained a knee injury while fencing against Pavel Pitra of the Czech Republic in the table of 16 at the March Grand Prix in Budapest, Hungary. The injury prevented him from taking part in the 2015 Asian Championships and the World Championships. He returned to competition a year later, winning a bronze medal in the Vancouver world cup in February 2016.

Medal Record

Olympic Games

World Championship

Asian Championship

Grand Prix

World Cup

Personal life
Park is a graduate of Korea National Sport University. One of his contemporaries at university was pentathlete Jun Woong-tae, his close friend.

References

1995 births
Living people
People from Jinju
South Korean male épée fencers
Korea National Sport University alumni
Fencers at the 2016 Summer Olympics
Olympic fencers of South Korea
Olympic gold medalists for South Korea
Olympic medalists in fencing
Medalists at the 2016 Summer Olympics
Fencers at the 2014 Asian Games
Fencers at the 2018 Asian Games
Asian Games gold medalists for South Korea
Asian Games silver medalists for South Korea
Asian Games bronze medalists for South Korea
Asian Games medalists in fencing
Medalists at the 2014 Asian Games
Medalists at the 2018 Asian Games
South Korean Buddhists
Fencers at the 2020 Summer Olympics
Medalists at the 2020 Summer Olympics
Olympic silver medalists for South Korea
Sportspeople from South Gyeongsang Province